Phrom Buri is a district (amphoe) in the eastern part of Sing Buri province, central Thailand.

History
The town (mueang) of Phrom Buri dates back to before the reign of King U Thong, the first king of Ayutthaya kingdom. The old city was at Wat Amphawan, Tambon Phrom Buri. Later the center of the city was moved to Pak Bang Muen Han (ปากบางหมื่นหาญ) and to the north side of Wat Phromma Thephawat.

During the Thesaphiban reforms, Phrom Buri was one of the provinces included into Monthon Krungkao (later renamed to Monthon Ayutthaya) in 1895. It was later downgraded to a district in Sing Buri Province.

In 1943 the district office was moved to its present location on the north side of Wat Kudi Thong.

Geography
Neighboring districts are (from the east clockwise) Tha Wung of Lopburi province, Chaiyo and Pho Thong of Ang Thong province, Tha Chang and Mueang Sing Buri of Sing Buri Province.

Administration

Central administration 
Phrom Buri is divided into seven sub-districts (tambons), which are further subdivided into 42 administrative villages (mubans).

Local administration 
There are two sub-district municipalities (thesaban tambons) in the district:
 Bang Nam Chiao consisting of sub-district Bang Nam Chiao.
 Phrom Buri consisting of sub-district Phrom Buri.

There are four sub-district administrative organizations (SAO) in the district:
 Phra Ngam consisting of sub-district Phra Ngam.
 Ban Mo consisting of sub-district Ban Mo.
 Ban Paeng consisting of sub-district Ban Paeng.
 Rong Chang consisting of sub-districts Rong Chang and Hua Pa.

References

External links
amphoe.com (Thai)

Districts of Singburi province
Former provinces of Thailand